Francisco González Ledesma (17 March 1927 – 2 March 2015) was a Spanish comic writer, novelist, lawyer, and journalist. He was a prize-winning crime novelist under his real name, and as Enrique Moriel. He wrote more than 1000 novels under the popular pen name Silver Kane, most of them Western novels. He also used the pseudonyms of Taylor Nummy, Silvia Valdemar, and for romance novels Rosa Alcázar and Fernando Robles.

Death
González Ledesma died in Barcelona from complications of a stroke, aged 87.

Literary Prizes
1948: Premio Internacional de Novela for Sombras viejas
1984: Premio Planeta de Novela for Crónica sentimental en rojo
1986: Prix Mystère for La Dama de Cachemira
2002: Premio Hammett for El pecado o algo parecido
2005: Prix Mystère for Cinco mujeres y media
2007: RBA Prize for Crime Writing for Una novela de barrio ("A Neighborhood Novel"), the world's most lucrative crime fiction prize at €125,000.

Bibliography

As Francisco González Ledesma

Single novels 
 Sombras viejas (1948)
 El mosquetero azul (1962)
 Los Napoleones (1977)
 Soldados (1985)
 42 Kilómetros de Compasión (1986)
 Los símbolos (1987)
 Cine Soledad (1993)
 El adoquín azul (2002)
 Tiempo de venganza (2003)
 Historia de mis calles (2006)

Méndez Series 
 Expediente Barcelona (1983)
 Las calles de nuestros padres (1984)
 Crónica sentimental en rojo (1984)
 La Dama de Cachemira (1986)
 Historia de Dios en una esquina (1991)
 El pecado o algo parecido (2002)
 Cinco mujeres y media (2005)
 Méndez (2006)
 Una novela de barrio (2007)
 No hay que morir dos veces (2009)
 Peores maneras de morir (2013)

As Silver Kane 
 Rancho Dracula (1960)
 Doscientos millones de muertos (1968)
 Recuérdame al morir (2007)
 La dama y el recuerdo (2010)

As Enrique Moriel 
 La ciudad sin tiempo (2007)
 El candidato de Dios (2008)

As Rosa Alcázar 
 Dueña y señora (1957)
 El lago de las vírgenes (1957)
 Nuestra última noche (1957)
 Prisión para corazones (1957)
 Tan sólo una mujer (1957)
 Tres pasos por el cielo (1957)
 Un beso por compasión (1957)
 Crecemos en nuestro amor	(1958)
 Desde que nos vimos (1958)
 La segunda mujer (1958)
 La vida de una mujer (1958)
 Mi segundo amor (1958)
 Nuestra tía Maribel (1958)
 Un mundo para ti (1958)
 La fugitiva (1959)
 Las almas también lloran (1959)
 Mi novio, el Marqués (1959)
 Su último adiós (1959)
 Vida (1959)
 La chica del coche rojo (1960)
 Las olvidadas (1960)
 Tres hombres en la noche (1960)
 Un hombre sin piedad (1960)
 Un día para amar (1961)
 Bonita y nada más (1963)
 Enamorados sin amor	(1963)
 Los tres destinos de Ketty (1963)
 Prohibido enamorarse (1963)
 Estrella del sur (1965)

References

External links
 Biografía de González Ledesma 

1927 births
2015 deaths
Spanish journalists
Writers from Barcelona
20th-century Spanish novelists
21st-century Spanish novelists
Spanish crime fiction writers
Western (genre) writers
Spanish romantic fiction writers
Spanish male novelists
20th-century Spanish male writers
21st-century Spanish male writers